Evan Fallenberg (born August 8, 1961 in Cleveland, Ohio) is an American-born writer and translator residing in Israel. His debut novel Light Fell, published in 2008, won the Stonewall Book Award and the Edmund White Award, and was a shortlisted Lambda Literary Award nominee for Debut Fiction at the 21st Lambda Literary Awards. His second novel, When We Danced on Water, was published in 2011 by HarperPerennial, and his third, The Parting Gift, by Other Press in 2018. He has also published English translations of several Israeli writers, including Meir Shalev, Hanoch Levin, Ron Leshem and Batya Gur.

Life 

Originally from Cleveland, Ohio, he was educated at Georgetown University. He also studied in Switzerland, worked in Japan and settled in Israel in 1985.  He holds a BSFS in diplomacy from the School of Foreign Service at Georgetown University, and an MFA in creative writing from Vermont College of Fine Arts.

He currently teaches creative writing and literary translation at Bar-Ilan University in Ramat Gan, Israel, and is faculty co-director of the International low-residency MFA program in Creative Writing & Literary Translation at Vermont College of Fine Arts. 

Fallenberg renovated an ancient home in Acre as a writer's retreat and opened Arabesque, an Arts and Residency Center in the heart of Old Acre, Israel, in 2016. Arabesque was destroyed in the May 2021 riots but was restored, and opened again to the public several months later. 

Fallenberg has served as a judge or advisor to a number of literary prizes, including the Sami Rohr Prize and the Galtelli Literary Awards.  He has received fellowships for residencies from the MacDowell Colony, the National Endowment for the Arts (at Vermont Studio Center), Fondation Ledig-Rowohlt (at Chateau de Lavigny, Switzerland), Banff Centre for the Arts (Canada), Hannesarholt and Gunnarshus in Iceland, Sun Yat-sen University of China, and the Bogliasco Foundation (Italy), and has taken part in conferences and festivals around the globe.

Publications

Novels 
 The Parting Gift, New York : Other Press, 2018. , 
 Light Fell New York: Soho, 2008. ,  
 When We Danced on Water, New York: Harper Perennial, 2011. ,

Awards

Won/ Shortlisted
American Library Association's Barbara Gittings Stonewall Book Award for Literature
Edmund White Award for Debut Fiction; the National Jewish Book Award in fiction
Lambda Literary Award for Debut Fiction
Samuel Goldberg Foundation Prize for Jewish Fiction by Emerging Writers
Harold U. Ribalow Award
PEN Translation Prize
Times Literary Supplement of London Risa Domb/Porjes Prize for Translation of Hebrew Literature

References

External links 

Evan Fallenberg's Bar Ilan University homepage

21st-century American novelists
American male novelists
Israeli novelists
Israeli translators
Jewish American writers
Gay Jews
American LGBT novelists
LGBT people from Ohio
Israeli LGBT novelists
American emigrants to Israel
Gay novelists
Writers from Cleveland
Israeli gay writers
American gay writers
Living people
1961 births
21st-century American male writers
Novelists from Ohio
21st-century American translators
Stonewall Book Award winners
21st-century American Jews